"Your Town" is the first single from Scottish band Deacon Blue's fourth studio album, Whatever You Say, Say Nothing (1993). Additional versions of the single release contain various dance remixes of "Your Town".

Track listings 
All songs written by Ricky Ross, except where noted:

UK release

US release

Charts

References

Deacon Blue songs
Columbia Records singles
1992 singles
1992 songs
Songs written by Ricky Ross (musician)